ChukotAVIA (short for Чукотские авиалинии) is an airline based in Anadyr, Chukotka Autonomous Okrug, Russia. It operates passenger, cargo, and utility services. Its main base is Anadyr Ugolny Airport.

History
The airline was established and started operations in 1996. It was formed by the merger of Anadyr and Chaunski Air Enterprises. It is owned by Anadyr Air Enterprise, Keperveyem Air Enterprise, Mys Shmidta Air Enterprise and Pevek Air Enterprise. In 2020, it became part of Russia's single far-eastern airline, along with four other airlines.

Fleet

As of 2016, the Chukotavia fleet comprises the following aircraft:

Fleet upgrade

In 2014, Chukotavia leased two DHC-6-400 Twin Otter turboprop aircraft to replace helicopters on its regional flights, with additional two aircraft purchased in 2015.

Destinations
Anadyr Ugolny Airport
Beringovsky Airport, Beringovsky
Keperveyem Airport, Bilibino
Kresta Bay Airport, Egvekinot
Lavrentiya Airport
Markovo Airport

Pevek Airport
Provideniya Bay Airport
Vayegi

References

External links

Official website

Airlines of Russia
Airlines established in 1996
Federal State Unitary Enterprises of Russia
Companies based in Chukotka Autonomous Okrug